Kopnino is a rural locality (a village) in Butylitskoye Rural Settlement, Melenkovsky District, Vladimir Oblast, Russia. The population was 107 as of 2010. There are 3 streets.

Geography 
Kopnino is located on the Unzha River, 18 km north of Melenki (the district's administrative centre) by road. Verkhounzha is the nearest rural locality.

References 

Rural localities in Melenkovsky District